Sidus or Sidous was a village in ancient Corinthia, on the Saronic Gulf, between Crommyon and Schoenus. It was taken by the Lacedaemonians along with Crommyon in the Corinthian War, but was recovered by Iphicrates.

Its site is located near the modern Sousaki.

References

Populated places in ancient Corinthia
Former populated places in Greece